Colin Pascoe (born 9 April 1965) is a Welsh former professional footballer. He attained ten caps for the Welsh national team.

Playing career

Club
He played his club football for Swansea City, Sunderland and Blackpool. He was a part of the Swansea team that won after a penalty shootout in the 1994 Football League Trophy Final.

Managerial career
On 31 May 2012, Liverpool confirmed that three from Swansea City – assistant manager Pascoe, performance analyst Chris Davies and performance consultant Glen Driscoll – would join the club with immediate effect following manager Brendan Rodgers in a move to Liverpool.

On 30 December 2012, Pascoe took charge of the Liverpool team against Q.P.R., as manager Brendan Rodgers had a virus. This was the second time Pascoe had taken over managerial duties, having previously taken charge against Arsenal whilst at Swansea. Liverpool won the game 3–0.

In June 2015, Pascoe was sacked by Liverpool as assistant manager.

References

External links

1965 births
Living people
Sportspeople from Port Talbot
Association football midfielders
Welsh footballers
Wales international footballers
Swansea City A.F.C. players
Sunderland A.F.C. players
Blackpool F.C. players
Merthyr Tydfil F.C. players
Carmarthen Town A.F.C. players
English Football League players
Cymru Premier players
Liverpool F.C. non-playing staff
Swansea City A.F.C. non-playing staff